Lyon Cathedral is a Roman Catholic church located on Place Saint-Jean in central Lyon, France. The cathedral is dedicated to Saint John the Baptist, and is the seat of the Archbishop of Lyon. Begun in 1180 on the ruins of a 6th-century church, it was completed in 1476. Despite its long construction time, it has a relatively consistent architectural style. In 1998, the building, along with other historic sites in the center of Lyon, was inscribed on the UNESCO World Heritage List.

History
The cathedral was founded by Saint Pothinus and Saint Irenaeus, the first two bishops of Lyon. The cathedral is also known as a "Primatiale" because in 1079 the Pope granted to the archbishop of Lyon the title of Primate of All the Gauls with the legal supremacy over the principal archbishops of the kingdom. It is located in the heart of the old town (Vieux Lyon) and it backs up to the Saône river, with a large plaza in front of it and a metro stop nearby providing easy access to and from the city center.

Patiens of Lyon, who was bishop around 450 AD, built a new cathedral, dedicated to Saint Stephen. Later, in the seventh century, a baptistery dedicated to Saint John was constructed as an accessory building to the church. The Church of St. Croix was also near. This location later became the site of the Cathédrale Saint-Jean-Baptiste.

In 1245, the cathedral hosted the First Council of Lyon.

In 1819 J. M. W. Turner sketched a study of the cathedral as seen from the heights of the Fourvière Hill. Edgar Degas used the cathedral for the setting of his painting "Ceremony of Ordination at Lyon Cathedral."

Festival of Light
Each December, Lyon holds an annual Festival of Lights. The tradition dates to 1643, when on 8 December the people of Lyon would place a lit candle in the window, a custom still maintained by many residents to this day. During the festival, a choreographed lighting display appears on the façade of the cathedral.

Description
The building is 80 meters long (internally), 20 meters wide at the choir, and 32.5 meters high in the nave. The apse and choir are of Romanesque design; the nave and façade are Gothic.

Noteworthy are the two crosses to right and left of the altar, preserved since the Second Council of Lyon of 1274 as a symbol of the union of the churches, and the Bourbon chapel, built by the Cardinal Charles II, Duke of Bourbon, and his brother Pierre de Bourbon, son-in-law of Louis XI, a masterpiece of 15th century sculpture.

The cathedral also has the Lyon Astronomical Clock from the 14th century.

The cathedral organ was built by Daublaine and Callinet and was installed in 1841 at the end of the apse and had 15 stops. It was rebuilt in 1875 by Merklin-Schütze and given 30 stops, three keyboards of 54 notes and pedals for 27.

Until the construction of the Basilica of Notre-Dame de Fourvière, it was the pre-eminent church in Lyon.

Renowned organist Edouard Commette served as the resident organist for most of the first half of the 20th century.

Burials 
Cardinal Foulon
Cardinal Gerlier

Gallery

Sources
 Association Cathédrale de Lyon Primatiale Saint John n.d.

See also 
Basilica of Notre-Dame de Fourvière
Basilica of Saint-Martin d'Ainay
Église Saint-Paul
List of Gothic Cathedrals in Europe

References

5th arrondissement of Lyon
Roman Catholic cathedrals in France
Roman Catholic churches in Lyon
World Heritage Sites in France
Articles containing video clips
Roman Catholic churches completed in 1480
15th-century Roman Catholic church buildings in France